The Macchi MB.308, later Aermacchi MB-308, was a light aircraft produced in Italy in the late 1940s.

Development

It was a conventional high-wing cantilever monoplane with fixed tricycle undercarriage. Construction throughout was of wood. The pilot and a single passenger or instructor sat side by side, and later examples had a third seat behind them.

The MB.308 was ordered in quantity by the Italian Air Force, which leased them out to Italy's aeroclubs. A modified version with a higher-powered engine was put into production in Argentina, under licence to sailplane manufacturer German Bianco.

Operators

Argentine National Gendarmerie

Egyptian Air Force

Italian Air Force (Aeronautica Militare Italiana) - received 81 aircraft in 1948 and were retired in 1954

Lebanese Air Force

Variants

 MB.308 - main production version with Continental C85 engine
 MB.308 Idro - seaplane version
 MB.308G - three-seat version with Continental C90 engine
 MB.308G-100 - MB.308G built in Argentina with Continental O-200 engine and fuel tanks relocated from fuselage to wings

Specifications (MB.308 - C85 engine)

See also

References

Notes

Bibliography 

 
 
 
 

M.B.308
1940s Italian civil utility aircraft
High-wing aircraft
Single-engined tractor aircraft
Aircraft first flown in 1947